Charles Augustine González (born May 5, 1945) is an American Democratic politician from Texas. He  represented Texas's 20th congressional district in the U.S. House of Representatives from 1999 to 2013. He served as Chairman of Latinos for Obama and National Co-Chair of President Obama's 2012 re-election campaign.

Early life, education, and legal career
González was born in San Antonio, Texas, the son of Bertha Marie (née Cuellar) and Henry B. González, who represented the 20th from 1961 until his son took over in 1999. His parents, of Mexican descent, were both Texas-born. Charlie graduated from Thomas A. Edison High School. He received his bachelor's degree in government from the University of Texas at Austin in 1969, and then later earned his Juris Doctor degree from St. Mary's University in San Antonio in 1972. As a youth, he was a Boy Scout in Troop 90 of San Antonio. His father was the Scoutmaster.

González served as a technical sergeant in the Texas Air National Guard from 1969 until 1975. He then began practicing law until 1982 when he began rising through the ranks of the court system. He served first as a municipal court judge, then later as a judge in county and then district court, both of which are elected positions.

U.S. House of Representatives

Elections
Henry González, of Texas's 20th congressional district, had long groomed his son to be his successor. When his father didn't seek a full 19th term in 1998, Charlie ran for the seat. In a crowded seven-way Democratic primary, Gonzalez led the field with 44%, missing the 50% threshold to avoid a run-off. In that election, he defeated San Antonio City Councilwoman Maria Antonietta Berriozabal 62%-38%. In the general election, he defeated Republican James Walker 63%-36%. He became only the fourth person to represent the 20th District since its creation in 1935. In fact, Charlie's first race was the first open-seat race in the district's 64-year history.  However, he had effectively assured himself of succeeding his father with his primary win.  The 20th is a heavily Democratic, majority-Hispanic district; the Republicans have only put up nominal candidates in this district since Henry won it in a 1961 special election.

Charlie kept this tradition going.  He was re-elected six more times, and never won re-election with less than 63% of the vote.  He only faced a Republican challenger three times, in 2004, 2008 and 2010. He had no major-party opposition in 2000 and 2006 and was completely unopposed in 2002.

He decided to retire and not seek another term in 2012.

Tenure
Charlie González is a member of the New Democrat Coalition. He is generally seen as less confrontational than his father, who once punched someone for calling him a communist. Between them, the father and son represented the 20th for 52 consecutive years; the only family combination to serve longer in the House has been the Dingells of Michigan, who have represented various districts centered around Detroit and its suburbs for almost 90 consecutive years.

Rep. González was one of the first congressmen to actively support Barack Obama in the 2008 Democratic presidential primary. "Senator Obama brings all these new fresh faces,’’ Gonzalez told the San Antonio Express-News. "He has a wider audience. He has the greater potential to engage a greater number of people.’’

González announced on November 25, 2011, that he would not seek reelection in the 2012 congressional elections. He said he wanted a job that would allow him "to be productive and have the resources to make a better life" for himself and his family.

Committee assignments
Committee on Energy and Commerce
Subcommittee on Commerce, Manufacturing and Trade
Subcommittee on Energy and Power
Subcommittee on Health
Committee on House Administration
Subcommittee on Elections (Ranking Member)
Subcommittee on Oversight

Caucus memberships
Congressional Hispanic Caucus (Chair)
Congressional LGBT Equality Caucus
Congressional Arts Caucus

See also

List of Hispanic and Latino Americans in the United States Congress

References

External links
U.S. Representative Charles A. Gonzalez official U.S. House website
Charles A. Gonzalez Congressional Committee official campaign website
 

|-

|-

1945 births
21st-century American politicians
American judges of Mexican descent
American politicians of Mexican descent
Democratic Party members of the United States House of Representatives from Texas
Hispanic and Latino American members of the United States Congress
Living people
Politicians from San Antonio
St. Mary's University School of Law alumni
Texas National Guard personnel
Texas state court judges
United States Air Force airmen